The 2019 Euro Winners Cup was the seventh edition of the Euro Winners Cup (EWC), an annual continental beach soccer tournament for men's top-division European clubs. The championship is the sport's version of the better known UEFA Champions League in association football.

Organised by Beach Soccer Worldwide (BSWW), the tournament was held in Nazaré, Portugal from 30 May till 9 June 2019, consisting of a preliminary qualifying round and the competition proper.

Following the qualifying round, the competition proper began with a round robin group stage. At its conclusion, the best teams progressed to the knockout stage, a series of single elimination games to determine the winners, starting with the Round of 16 and ending with the final. Consolation matches were also played to determine other final rankings.

Braga of Portugal were the defending champions and successfully defended their title after beating KP Łódź of Poland 6-0 in the final.

Teams
A record 60 teams from 24 countries have entered the championship; 36 qualify straight into the main round whilst 24 compete in the Euro Winners Challenge to attempt to qualify for the competition proper.

Qualification

Entrants

Key: H: Hosts \ TH: Title holders

Venues

Two venues were used in one host city: Nazaré, Leiria District, Portugal.
Matches took place at Praia de Nazaré (Nazaré Beach) on one of two pitches:

Euro Challenge Cup

The Euro Winners Challenge is open to all clubs who did not automatically qualify for the main round as domestic league champions. At least eight teams will qualify for the Euro Winners Cup. Those will be distributed in two groups of four teams. The two top teams will progress to the Round of 16, and the winner of that round will enter the quarterfinals. Beside that, the winner team will be champion of the Euro Winners Challenge.

Overview

Group A

Group B

Group C

Group D

Group E

Group F

Subsequent rounds

Second group stage

The eight qualifiers progressed to the second group stage that took place as part of the main round of the EWC.

Final

The best two teams of the second group stage advanced to the final that took place as part of the Round of 16 of the EWC.

Main round

All times are local, WEST (UTC+1).

Group A

Group B

Group C

Group D

Group E

Group F

Group G

Group H

Group I

Group J (Euro Challenge Cup qualifiers – Group 1)

Group K (Euro Challenge Cup qualifiers – Group 2)

Knockout stage

Round of 32

Round of 16

Quarter-finals

9–16 places

1st–8th place

Semi-finals

13–16 places

5–8 places

1st–4th place

Finals

15th-place match

13th-place match

11th-place match

9th-place match

7th-place match

5th-place match

3rd-place match

Championship final

Awards

Top goalscorers
Players who scored at least 10 goals

Goals scored in both the competition proper and the preliminary round are counted.

26 goals
 Gabriele Gori ( BSC Artur Music)

19 goals
 Dejan Stankovic ( Alanya Beledi̇yespor)

16 goals
 Boris Nikonorov ( Lokomotiv Moscow)

14 goals
 Izaias Pereira Ramos ( CSKA Moscow)
 Llorenç ( Lokomotiv Moscow)
 Dmitry Shishin ( BSC Kristall)

13 goals
 Rodrigo ( BSC Kristall)

11 goals
 Bokinha ( SC Braga)
 Mauricinho ( BSC Kristall)
 Jose Lucas da Cruz de Oliveira ( Sporting CP)
 Fedor Zemskov ( Spartak Moscow)

10 goals

 Lucao ( Catania BS)
 Alves do Nascimento Thanger ( FC Delta)
 Michail Kafantaris ( AO Kefallinia)
 Emmanuele Zurlo ( Catania BS)
 Andre da Silva Felix ( AD Buarcos)
 Cem Keskin ( Alanya Beledi̇yespor)
 Igor Levchenko ( BSC Vybor)

Source:

Final standings

See also
2019 Women's Euro Winners Cup

References

External links
Euro Winners Challenge  (preliminary round), at Beach Soccer Worldwide
Euro Winners Cup proper , at Beach Soccer Worldwide
Euro Winners Cup 2019, at Beach Soccer Russia

Euro Winners Cup
Euro
2019
2019 in beach soccer
Nazaré, Portugal
Euro Winners Cup
Euro Winners Cup